Elections in Bermuda have been taking place since 1620. Bermuda's current electoral system, with a lower house elected by all Bermudian status-holders, each casting a single vote, voting in single-member districts on the first-past-the-post method, came into effect with the 1968 constitution.

Electoral system
Bermuda elects on territorial level a legislature. Parliament has two chambers. The House of Assembly has 36 members, elected for a maximum five-year term in single seat constituencies. The Senate has 11 appointed members. Bermuda does not have fixed election dates; the Governor may dissolve Parliament and call a new election at any time, usually on the advice of the Premier.

Bermuda has a two-party system, which means that there are two dominant political parties (currently called the Progressive Labour Party and the One Bermuda Alliance).  Candidates getting elected under the banner of a third party or as an independent has been very rare since 1968 (only occurring in 1985, when two National Liberal Party candidates were elected, and in 1989, when one NLP and one independent candidate were elected).

Most recent election
An election was held on  October 1, 2020.  The results are below:

Past elections and referendums
You can browse historical election results since 1993 from https://web.archive.org/web/20101224093201/http://webapp.decouto.bm/elections/

See also
 Electoral calendar
 Electoral system

External links
Parliament website
Parliamentary Registry
Browse detailed election results online